"Is It Love?" is a song by Australian collective, Chili Hi Fly. The song was released in 1998 and peaked at number 57 on the ARIA Charts. The song contains a sample of Kool & the Gang's "Be My Lady".

At the ARIA Music Awards of 2000, the song was nominated for ARIA Award for Best Dance Release.

Track listings

Charts

References

1998 singles
1998 songs
Songs written by Claydes Charles Smith
Songs written by James "J.T." Taylor
Songs written by Robert "Kool" Bell
Songs written by Ronald Bell (musician)